Frederik Krabbe (born 10 March 1988) is a retired Danish footballer.

Career
Throughout his youth career Krabbe has played as a central defender, but, due to injuries, in the season 2007–08 he has deputized as a right back. On June 29, he signed a two-year contract with Danish club Lyngby Boldklub coming on a free transfer.

Krabbe comes from the talented class of 1988 from AGF, who won the championship in under-17 league in 2003, which included Michael Lumb, Morten Beck Andersen, Michael North, Niels Kristensen, Jesper Blicher, and Anders Syberg, all of whom later made their professional debut on AGF's senior team. He made his debut for AGF in 2005.

His strengths are speed, outstanding vision and aerial abilities.

In a friendly against AaB in July 2010, Krabbe suffered a serious injury which kept him out of rotation for more than six months.

On 24 May 2011, Krabbe's contract with AGF expired and one month later he signed a two-year deal with Lyngby Boldklub.

On 13 August 2019, Krabbe was loaned out to Danish 2nd Division club Hellerup IK for the rest of 2019 from Hvidovre IF. In January 2020 it was reported, that Krabbe had terminated his contract with Hvidovre and would continue at HIK.

On 28 May 2021, Krabbe announced his retirement from football.

References

External links
Danish national team profile
Official Danish Superliga stats
Frederik Krabbe at NFF

Living people
1988 births
Danish men's footballers
Danish expatriate men's footballers
Denmark under-21 international footballers
Aabyhøj IF players
Aarhus Gymnastikforening players
Lyngby Boldklub players
Arendal Fotball players
Hvidovre IF players
Hellerup IK players
Danish Superliga players
Danish 1st Division players
Danish 2nd Division players
Association football defenders
Expatriate footballers in Norway
Danish expatriate sportspeople in Norway
Footballers from Aarhus